Streptomyces kalpinensis is a Gram-positive bacterium species from the genus of Streptomyces which has been isolated from sand from the beach of Kalpin in China.

See also 
 List of Streptomyces species

References

External links
Type strain of Streptomyces kalpinensis at BacDive -  the Bacterial Diversity Metadatabase

kalpinensis
Bacteria described in 2017